Agargaon is a borough in the Bangladeshi city of Dhaka.

Education
Sher-e-Bangla Nagar Government Boys' High School is a public secondary school, established in 1969. In addition to its high school curriculum, the school started college level education in 2008.

Significant facilities 
 Local Government Engineering Department
 IDB Bhaban
 Bangladesh Computer Samity
 Bangabandhu International Conference Center
 Bangladesh Election Commission
 Weather office
 Immigration & Passport office
 Asian Development Bank
 Palli Karma-Sahayak Foundation
World Bank
Parjatan Bhaban
Lions Eye Institute & Hospital
Bangladesh Investment Development Authority
Department of Social Services (Bangladesh)

Hospital
Dhaka Shishu Hospital
National Institute of Traumatology and Orthopedic Rehabilitation
National Institute of Neurosciences & Hospital
National Institute of Cardiovascular Diseases, Bangladesh
National Institute of Laboratory Medicine & Referral Centre

Gallery

References

 Neighbourhoods in Dhaka